Coal Creek is a stream in Henry County in the U.S. state of Missouri.

Coal Creek was so named on account of coal deposits near its course.

See also
List of rivers of Missouri

References

Rivers of Henry County, Missouri
Rivers of Missouri